Corvino may refer to:

 Anthony Corvino (born 1965), American football player
 Corvino, a character in Volpone
 John Corvino, professor of philosophy at Wayne State University